Sydney Omameh, known by his stage name, Uch3nna, is an American musician and football player.
 
As a football player, he has played for Ohio Dominican Panthers, Grand Valley State, Columbus Destroyers, and Ottawa Redblacks. Omameh signed with the National Football League (NFL) in 2017.

Early life and family
Sydney Omameh was born in Columbus, Ohio. His father was a music producer. He received his early education from Westerville North High School. He completed his preparatory education at William Mason High School. At the age of eleven, he started producing music under the artistic name, Uch3nna, using FL Studio. He is a graduate of Old Dominion University and holds a degree in international business.

He is a brother of Patrick Omameh.

Career
Omameh's career began in 2011 for William Mason under the coaching of Brian Castner.  During the year, he played in eight games as a senior, recording 35 tackles, 12 for loss, three quarterback sacks, including a blocking a field goal at Ashland. During his senior year, he was named to the 1st team All-Conference and received an honorable mention in Ohio Southwest.

In 2013, Omameh was included in the Second Team All-GLIAC. During the same year, he was also selected for the First Team All-Ohio Division II. During 2013, he played 11 games and recorded 40 tackles, 13.5 tackles for loss, 7 sacks, and three blocked kicks.

In 2014, while playing as a defensive for Ohio Dominican, he scored the opening touchdown of a 28-24 Panthers victory by returning a 25-yard blocked kick for a touchdown. In December 2014, he named in the Daktronics All-Super Region Four team squad.

In September 2016, Omameh joined GVSU football after leaving Ohio Dominican in the summer of the season. Before joining GVSU, he spent four years in the Great Lakes Intercollegiate Athletic Conference (GLIAC). His notable contributions for Grand Valley include four sacks for them against Lakers.

In 2017, Omameh signed with the National Football League (NFL). During the same year, he was named among the Don Hansen All-Super Region Four Team squads.

In 2018, Omameh was signed by the Ottawa Redblacks of the Canadian Football League.

During the 2019 season, Omameh played for the Columbus Destroyers.

In October 2022, his single, "Fake", was released.

Discography
"Fake"
"Hate"
"Antidote"

References

Living people
African-American musicians
African-American players of American football